Radio Disney Latin America is a pop music and rock music network owned by The Walt Disney Company, which is broadcast in several countries in Latin America. The station is aimed primarily at youth and adolescents.

Availability 
Radio Disney is available in Argentina, Bolivia, Brazil, Chile, Costa Rica, Dominican Republic, Ecuador, Mexico, Panama, Paraguay, Peru and Uruguay.

2019 Mexico breakup
On December 26, 2019, Disney and its Mexican partner, Grupo ACIR, announced they were mutually ending their relationship, which had covered twelve Mexican cities. Ten of the twelve Radio Disney stations were transitioned to ACIR's replacement pop format, Match. 

However, Radio Disney stated in a press release that it would return on new stations in 2020. One article attributed the breakup to "three direct format competitors and an impressive surge in Spotify consumption in key market Mexico City.". Radio Disney returned to the country on February 1, 2020, exclusively on Mexico City station XHFO-FM.

Stations

Slogans 
"Aquí está tu música" (former) ("Here is your music")
"Escucha eso que quieres sentir" (2008–present) ("Hear what you wanna feel")
"A rádio que te Ouve" (Brazil) (2010–present) ("The radio that listens to you")
"La radio que te escucha" (Mexico) (2013–2019; 2020-present) ("The radio that listens to you")

Notes 
 Radio Disney Bolivia is a joint venture between The Walt Disney Company Latin America and Empresa de Comunicaciones del Oriente

See also 
Disney Channel Latin America
Radio Disney

References

External links 
Official website (Generic Website)
Radio Disney Brazil
Official website Perú

Latin America
Radio stations in Argentina
Mass media companies of Argentina
Latin America